Jauravia limbata, is a species of lady beetle native to India, Sri Lanka, Nepal and Bhutan.

Description
It is very similar to Synonychimorpha chittagongi. Body moderate in size. Dorsum is less convex with less broadly explanate lateral borders of elytra. Body length is 2.3 to 2.5 mm. Body broadly oval and convex. Head testaceous and eyes are black. Clypeus and other appendages are yellowish brown. Pronotum pale testaceous, and the scutellum is fuscous. Elytra is black but the lateral and apical borders with broad testaceous in color. Ventrum and legs are yellowish brown. Mesosternum, metasternum and the first two abdominal sternites are pale. Head and pronotum are finely and closely punctate as well as densely pubescent with white long hairs. Elytral punctures are slightly coarse, deep and dense. Elytral interspaces are narrow, smooth and shiny. Ventrum with fine and sparse punctures. Some parts of metasternum and abdominal sternites have coarser and closer punctures. Ventrum clothed with delicate, short and sparse pubescence.

References 

Coccinellidae
Insects of Sri Lanka
Beetles described in 1858
Insects of Nepal